Mary Pierce was the reigning champion, but did not compete this year.

Anna Chakvetadze won the title, defeating Nadia Petrova in the final 6–4, 6–4.

Seeds
A champion seed is indicated in bold text while text in italics indicates the round in which that seed was eliminated. The top four seeds received a bye to the second round.

Draw

Finals

Top half

Bottom half

External links
 Kremlin Cup Draw

Kremlin Cup
Kremlin Cup